Lý Thị Ngọc Kiều (1041 – 1113), dharma name Diệu Nhân (妙因), was a princess during the Lý dynasty in Vietnamese history. She was the 17th leader of the Vietnamese Vinītaruci school of Buddhism.


Biography
Diệu Nhân was born the eldest daughter of Lý Nhật Trung, a son of Emperor Lý Thái Tông, in 1041. She was raised in the royal court of Emperor Lý Thánh Tông, then married to a highland chief in Chau Dang (modern Hưng Hóa region). She became a Buddhist monk after the death of her husband.

Books
Đại Việt sử ký toàn thư (Tập I, bản dịch). Nhà xuất bản Khoa học Xã hội, Hà Nội, 1983.
 Noname, Thiền uyển tập anh ngữ lục (bản dịch của Ngô Đức Thọ và Nguyễn Thúy Nga). Nhà xuất bản Văn học, Hà Nội, 1990.
 Monk Thích Thanh Từ, Thiền sư Việt Nam. Thành hội Phật giáo Thành phố Hồ Chí Minh, 1992.
 Scholar Nguyễn Đăng Na, Văn học thế kỷ X-XIV. Nhà xuất bản Khoa học Xã hội, Hà Nội, 2004.
 Scholar Trần Thị Băng Thanh, Lý Ngọc Kiều - From a princess to monk Diệu Nhân, Faces in Thăng Long. Nhà xuất bản Hà Nội, 2010.
 Scholar Đoàn Thị Thu Vân, Poems of Lý Trần Period. Hội nghiên cứu giảng dạy văn học Thành phố Hồ Chí Minh cùng nhà xuất bản Văn Nghệ Thành phố Hồ Chí Minh hợp tác ấn hành năm 1998.

References

Notes

Works cited

Sources
 About monk Lý Thị Diễm
 Ni sư Diệu Nhân trong sách Thiền sư Việt Nam
 Ni sư Diệu Nhân
 Phan Hữu Nghệ, "Một cách hiểu bài thơ Sinh Lão Bệnh Tử của Ni sư Diệu Nhân" đăng trong Tạp chí Hán Nôm, số 1 (10), 1991

1041 births
1113 deaths
Lý dynasty princesses
Vietnamese Zen Buddhists
11th-century Vietnamese women
12th-century Vietnamese women
Vietnamese Buddhist nuns